1979–80 was the fifth season that Division 1 operated as the second tier of ice hockey in Sweden, below the top-flight Elitserien (now the Swedish Hockey League).

Division 1 was divided into four starting groups, based on geography. The top four teams in the group would continue to the playoffs to determine which clubs would participate in the qualifier for promotion to Elitserien. The bottom two teams in each group were relegated to Division 2 for the 1980–81 season.

Regular season

Northern Group

Eastern Group

Southern Group

Western Group

Playoffs

North/East

First round
 Timrå IK - Hammarby IF 1:2 (4:0, 2:4, 3:4)
 Kiruna AIF - Västerås IK 2:1 (13:3, 1:6, 4:1)
 Örebro IK - Luleå HF 0:2 (2:4, 5:6)
 Södertälje SK - IFK Kiruna 2:0 (12:4, 16:4)

Second round 
 Södertälje SK - Hammarby IF 2:1 (5:8, 3:1, 4:2)
 Luleå HF - Kiruna AIF 2:1 (5:1, 2:3, 4:2)

South/West

First round 
 Mora IK - Nybro IF 2:0 (2:1, 8:1)
 Bofors IK - IF Troja 2:1 (6:4, 2:7, 11:2)
 IFK Bäcken - IK Rommehed 0:2 (4:5, 4:5 OT)
 Karlskrona IK - Strömsbro IF 2:1 (9:4, 3:9, 6:4)

Second round 
 Mora IK - Karlskrona IK 2:1 (4:1, 0:7, 6:0)
 Bofors IK - IK Rommehed 2:1 (3:4, 4:3, 4:3)

Elitserien promotion

External links
Historical Division 1 statistics on Svenskhockey.com

Swedish Division I seasons
2
Swe